Yellowpages.com is a United States-based web site operated by Thryv that provides listings for local businesses. In 2013, it was re-branded as YP.com or simply "YP". It currently offers a broad range of marketing tools including online presence, local search, display ads and direct marketing. It was previously a wholly owned subsidiary of AT&T.

YP's consumer brands include the YP mobile app and yp.com, which are used by nearly 80 million consumers each month in the U.S. and The Real Yellow Pages directory. In May 2016, YP entered into a partnership with the Better Business Bureau, displaying ratings for listings of businesses that have earned an A or A+ rating or BBB accreditation.

History

Yellowpages.com was founded in 1996 during the dotcom boom, by multiple cofounders, including CEO Dane Madsen.  Yellowpages.com became part of Globalgate, an ecommerce incubator and investment company in 1998, which sold the business to its largest investors in 2001.   In late 2004, BellSouth Corp and SBC Communications Inc. purchased www.YellowPages.com Inc. reportedly for US$120 Million. The companies formed a joint venture to run the business. The two companies had been working together on another joint venture called Cingular, a wireless carrier in the US. Each company had its own Online Yellow Pages: BellSouth owned RealPages.com and SBC owned SmartPages.com. The two sites effectively merged into the newly acquired YellowPages.com.

In 2005, SBC acquired AT&T and took on the stronger AT&T brand. One year later, AT&T acquired Bellsouth for US$67 Billion. At this point, the YELLOWPAGES.com business was no longer a joint venture, instead, it became a wholly owned subsidiary of AT&T, also doing business as AT&T Interactive.

In 2009, the YELLOWPAGES.com site was rebranded as YP.com.

On May 8, 2012, Cerberus Capital Management acquired a majority share of YELLOWPAGES.com LLC, as well as the print Yellow Pages business from AT&T. The business is now operating under YP LLC. YP has expanded its offers to include digital marketing. In 2013, YP rebranded and position itself in the field of digital marketing, and in 2015, its marketing operations has been rebranded to YP Marketing Solutions.

On July 31, 2012, YP was included in PaidContent50's list of "the world's most successful digital media companies" based on 2011 digital ad revenue.

In July 2014, YP app was ranked #37 out of the top 100 applications downloaded for Apple's smartphone.

In July 2017, YP Holdings was acquired by Dex Media which became DexYP.

In September 2018, 13M users visited Yellowpages.com.  This is a revision from its current claim of 60M monthly users to Yellowpages.com.

References

External links

AT&T and BellSouth Join to Create a Premier Global Communications Company, AT&T News Room, December 29, 2006

YP Holdings
Former AT&T subsidiaries
Internet properties established in 1996
Online person databases
Online marketplaces of the United States
Yellow pages
Companies based in Glendale, California
Consumer guides